Salvia chionophylla is a low-growing evergreen perennial plant native to a small area in the state of Coahuila, Mexico. First described in 1907 by Merritt Lyndon Fernald, it was only seen in horticulture beginning around 1996.

Notes

chionophylla
Flora of Mexico